The 1916 New York state election was held on November 7, 1916, to elect the governor, the lieutenant governor, the Secretary of State, the state comptroller, the attorney general, the state treasurer, the state engineer, a U.S. Senator, the chief judge and an associate judge of the New York Court of Appeals, as well as all members of the New York State Assembly and the New York State Senate.

History
The primaries were held on September 19.

Republican primary

Democratic primary

Progressive primary

Independence League primary

American Party primary

Result
The whole Republican ticket was elected.

The incumbents Whitman, Schoeneck, Hugo, Travis, Woodbury, Wells and Williams were re-elected.

The Republican, Democratic, Socialist and Prohibition parties maintained automatic ballot access (necessary 10,000 votes); the Independence League, Progressive and American parties lost it; and the Socialist Labor Party did not re-attain it.

36 Republicans and 15 Democrats were elected to the New York State Senate, to sit in the 140th and 141st New York State Legislatures (1917–1918).

99 Republicans, 49 Democrats and 2 Socialists were elected to the New York State Assembly, to sit in the 140th New York State Legislature (1917).

Obs.: 
Numbers are total votes on all tickets for candidates who ran on more than one ticket, except for Whitman. The votes received for governor were used to determine ballot access.

Notes

Sources
Names on primary ballot: CANDIDATES RUSH TO FILE PETITIONS in NYT on August 23, 1916
Candidates in the primaries: PROGRESSIVE VOTE FACTOR IN PRIMARIES in NYT on September 17, 1916
Early returns of the primaries: Nominees Chosen at the Primaries in NYT on September 20, 1916
Primary results: CALDER BEAT BACON 9,007 in NYT on September 27, 1916
Sketches of Hiscock and Jenks: FOR CHIEF JUDGE OF THE COURT OF APPEALS in NYT on October 14, 1916
Early returns: WHITMAN BEATS SEABURY; CALDER CHOSEN SENATOR in NYT on November 8, 1916,
Vote totals from New York Red Book 1917

See also
New York gubernatorial elections
New York state elections

1916
New York